Arzew or Arzeu ( Berber) is a port city in Algeria, 25 miles (40 km) from Oran. It is the capital of Arzew District, Oran Province.

History

Antiquity

Like the rest of North Africa, the site of modern-day Arzew was originally inhabited by the Berbers. Arzew's original Berber population came mainly from the nearby town of Bethioua, families from nearby Mostaganem, Kabyles that were deported there.

It was named Arsenaria, or Portus Magnus (Great Harbour) under the Roman Empire (the latter name is the one that can be seen in its former coat of arms). It has several Roman remains, mosaics, and artworks, which were removed to the museum of nearby Oran. During Roman times, Arzew's exports used to be grain and salt. The Vandals destroyed Portus Magnus in 429/430.

Since the Muslim conquests, it regained some importance, as it was noted by the geographer El Bekri, during his description of North Africa (1068) where he described the Roman ruins as Arzao, an abandoned Roman port. The Almohads refounded the port in 1162. Under the Ziyanids, the port, located near the Ziyanid Tlemcen was renamed to Marsa Ben Zian (i.e. the port of the Zian tribe).

French Algeria
On 10 July 1833, the French forces coming from Oran went further east and occupied the locality, which was then simply called Marsa (i.e. port). After years of war (ended by the Treaty of Desmichels) Arzew became a legal possession of France, with its name transliterated in Arabic as Arziou (Arziw) and in French as Arzowe.

King Louis-Philippe ordered the creation of the settlement of Arzew Le Port on 12 August 1845, which encouraged people from Europe to settle the area. It became a fully functional commune on 31 December 1856. It was an important war site during World War II (see Operation Torch).

During the Algerian War the city hosted one of the two SDECE French intelligence service CIPCGs ("counter-guerrilla and pacification instruction centre").

Algerian republic
After the independence of Algeria in 1962, Arzew became an important port and industrial area, home to a refinery exporting LNG (liquified natural gas), as well as a fleet of small fishing boats to work the local waters.

Demography

Culture
During the French colonial era, the settlers introduced a Roman Catholic celebration on August 15 -Assumption of Mary day- known as the "Procession of the Virgin" (la Procession de la Vierge).

Notes

References

External links

111th Observation Squadron World War II Narrative History, Part VI:  The Battle Of Arzew - John C.L. Scribner
French manoeuvre in Arzew, March 1958 (rush without audio)
Map of 1932

Communes of Oran Province
Berber words and phrases